James D. "Jim" Rogers (born 1949) was the President and CEO of Kampgrounds of America (KOA) until December 2015 (when Pat Hittmeier took over). He lives in Reno, NV.  Rogers first job at KOA started in 1972 as a management trainee. He stayed for nearly three years before heading to UCLA to complete a master's degree in business administration. After a couple of years as general manager of a South Lake Tahoe resort, he went to work for Harrah's Entertainment Inc. in 1978, eventually becoming senior vice president and general manager of Harrah's Reno in 1994. Then, in January 2000, he returned to KOA as president and chief executive officer.

Scouting
Rogers became an Eagle Scout in Greenbrae, California in 1965 and a recipient of the Distinguished Eagle Scout Award from the Nevada Area Council of the Boy Scouts of America in Reno, Nevada in 2002. Rogers received the BSA's highest national volunteer award, The Silver Buffalo, in May, 2016. Scouting's values play an important role in this entire family.  He has a wife, Sandy, and three sons: Ben, Judd, and Tyler; all three are Eagle Scouts. Rogers is the brother of T. Gary Rogers, who is also an Eagle Scout and Distinguished Eagle Scout.  Their brother Don is also an Eagle Scout; as are seven of the family's sons, for a total of 10 Eagle Scouts across two generations of this family.

Rogers is a member of the National Executive Board of the Boy Scouts of America, the organization's governing body.

References

External links
 KOA website

1949 births
Living people
American chief executives of travel and tourism industry companies
People from Billings, Montana
People from Greenbrae, California
Businesspeople from Reno, Nevada
National Executive Board of the Boy Scouts of America members
University of California, Berkeley alumni